The San Francisco Belt Railroad was a short-line railroad along the Embarcadero in San Francisco, California.  It began as the State Belt Railroad in 1889, and was renamed when the city bought the Port of San Francisco in 1969.  As a state owned enterprise, the railroad asserted several unsuccessful claims to immunity from federal regulation.   The railroad ceased operation in 1993.

The railroad connected the Port of San Francisco to many waterfront docks and to industries and warehouses which were adjacent to the waterfront.  In its early years, it operated dual-gauged track to accommodate the North Pacific Coast Railroad and South Pacific Coast Railroad. It would eventually have 67 miles (108 km) of trackage and general offices in the Ferry Building. Its function was to switch railroad cars from four major railroads to points along its system and vice versa. At the southern portion of the line, a track along King Street (passing the location now occupied by Oracle Park) connected with the Southern Pacific. A train ferry slip at Pier 43 allowed interchange with the Northwestern Pacific, the Western Pacific, and the Atchison, Topeka & Santa Fe railroads.  To reach its northern terminus in the Presidio, the line passed through Fisherman's Wharf, Aquatic Park, and Fort Mason Tunnel. 

The San Francisco Bay Railroad is the successor to the Belt Railroad and received approval to operate the remaining five miles of track in 2000.

The line was largely paved over to form the current Embarcadero, with rails set in the median for streetcar and light rail services. San Francisco Municipal Railway's E Embarcadero line now traverses the route between the Caltrain (former Southern Pacific) station and Fisherman's Wharf, with other lines covering portions of the route. The former roundhouse has been converted to commercial business but exists in a recognizable form on the Sansome St, Lombard St, The Embarcadero, and Chestnut St block.

Notable employees
Harry K. McClintock Who worked as an engine foreman in San Francisco from 1922 to 1925, and Outer Harbor Terminal Railway Company, Home Guard, San Pedro 1938 to 1943. The Big Rock Candy Mountains

Locomotives 

During its years of operation the railroad had 12 steam locomotives and 6 ALCO diesel engines:

Special trains

Over the years, the belt railroad's tracks hosted several noteworthy locomotives and trains.

In 1948 the first Freedom Train made an appearance on the State Belt Railroad.

In 1949, the California Zephyr was positioned near the Ferry Building for its inaugural ceremony.

In 1951, the Maritime Museum brought an early 4-4-0 steam locomotive and consist to the belt, as part of the museum’s grand opening.

In 1971, the Flying Scotsman concluded its American tour by shuttling back and forth on a stretch of track adjacent to the Embarcadero and near Fisherman's Wharf. Owner Alan Peglar ran out of funds and the locomotive spent most of 1972 stored at an army base in Stockton, California.

In 1975, the American Freedom Train pulled by ex-Southern Pacific Daylight locomotive #4449 visited San Francisco. For public viewing, the train's cars were switched to the Presidio by the belt line. The locomotive itself remained on display at Aquatic Park near the foot of Hyde Street.

In March of 1977, the Canadian Pacific Royal Hudson #2860 visited the State Belt while heading down to Los Angeles.

In 1987, the tracks along the Embarcadero just south of Sansome Street hosted Railfair ’87. Diesel locomotives and steam locomotives including V&T's J.W. Bowker (2-4-0 locomotive) were on display.

Steam Locomotive Number Four

Currently Locomotive #4 is being restored by the San Francisco Trains group, with larger plans to change the old Bayshore Roundhouse, originally owned by Southern Pacific, to a historic community destination. Due to work on the Roundhouse, it has been listed on the National Register of Historic Places.

See also

 Fred E. Stewart, former superintendent

References

External links

 Abandoned tracks of the San Francisco Belt Railroad
 San Francisco Trains - State Belt Railroad
 

Defunct California railroads
Transportation in San Francisco
History of San Francisco
Railway companies disestablished in 1993